Little George Island Ecological Reserve is an ecological reserve located on an island in the Lake Winnipeg, Manitoba, Canada. It was established in 2004 under the Manitoba Ecological Reserves Act.

See also
 List of ecological reserves in Manitoba
 List of protected areas of Manitoba

References

External links
 Little George Island Ecological Reserve, Backgrounder
 iNaturalist: Little George Island Ecological Reserve

Protected areas established in 2004
Ecological reserves of Manitoba
Nature reserves in Manitoba
Protected areas of Manitoba